Rose Okoji Oko (27 September 1956 – 23 March 2020) was a Nigerian politician and senator. She was a Member of the Federal House of Representatives from the People's Democratic Party (PDP), representing  Yala/Ogoja Federal Constituency in Nigeria's 7th National Assembly. She was elected into office as the first female representative from her constituency in June 2011 and sat as Deputy Chairman House Committee on Education. She was the Senator representing the people of Cross River North Senatorial District. She was elected into office as the first female representative from her Senatorial District in June 2015.

Life and education
Born on 27 September 1956 to Agbo Ojeka from Opkoma, Yala LGA, Cross River State, and father Thomas Ojeka also from Opkoma. She grew up the first of two children from her mother and the seventh of fifteen from her father. She collected her first School Leaving Certificate in 1977 from WTC Primary School Enugu after which in 1975 she attended Federal School of Arts & Science Ogoja in Cross River State to acquire her Higher School Certificate (Nigeria). In 1981 she graduated with an upper second-class B.A.(Hons) degree in Linguistics from the University of Calabar, Cross River state. A graduate course in Linguistics shortly followed at the University of Wisconsin, Madison, USA. A career educationalist, Okoji Oko returned to University of Calabar and graduated with an M.A. in Linguistics in 1984. By 1990 she graduated from The University of Port Harcourt in Rivers State where she acquired her Doctorate in Linguistics. Several years later in 2007, she enrolled in and graduated from the Management Institute of Canada, where she acquired an M.B.A.She is blessed with 6 children.

Early career 
Okoji Oko started her career in the Nigerian Youth Service Corps as a tutor in Edgerly Memorial Girls Secondary School, Calabar in 1981. Between 1982 and 1983 she taught at St. Patricks College, Calabar and in the same year moved to become a lecturer at the Cross River School of Basic Studies Akampka. She held this position till 1984 when she moved to the University of Calabar to become an Assistant Lecturer in the Department of Language and Linguistics until 1986 when she was promoted to become Lecturer in the same department.  In 1989 at the age of 33, she was recognized for her years of service and started her career as a public servant when she was appointed Commissioner of Education, Cross River State; a position she held till 1991. In that same period, she served as Chairperson Better Life Programme, Cross River Chapter from 1990–1991.

In 1993 she was appointed Director General, National Defence & Security Council, Cabinet Secretariat under the military presidency. She held this position simultaneously with the National Commissioner, National Electoral Commission (NEC) now known as Independent National Electoral Commission (INEC). Between 1993 and 1994 she was appointed Director General, Provisional Ruling Council again under the then Military Presidency.
In 2002 she retired.

Political career 
In 1999 Rose registered and formed part of the team to introduce the People's Democratic Party (PDP) to Cross River State as an inactive member of the party. Between 2002 and 2004 after she retired from public service, she registered and introduced the National Democratic Party (NDP) to Cross River State and served as the Deputy Chairman South, Board of Trustees, NDP.  In 2003 when Nigeria held the first democratic election since the handover of power from military to civilian rule, Okoji Oko contested as a senate candidate, Cross River State North Senatorial District under the NDP banner, a contest she lost to the PDP candidate at the time.  She continued to serve as chairman of the board of trustees for the NDP party up until 2007, when she ran in the country's second official democratic election as a gubernatorial candidate for Cross River State, a contest she lost to the PDP candidate.

In that same year, she re-enlisted as a member with the PDP and in the 2011 democratic elections ran for Member National Assembly, Federal House of Representatives. Yala/Ogoja Federal Constituency. A position she held until her death.  She was elected as a senator and she represented the north of the state where she was born. There were over 100 senators elected in the 8th National Assembly in 2015, but only six of these were women. The others were Stella Oduah and Uche Ekwunife who both represent Anambra. Fatimat Raji Rasaki, Oluremi Tinubu and Binta Garba.

The legislative elections that held on the 23rd of February, 2019 produced seven female senators in the 9th National Assembly of which she was elected again. The others include; Stella Oduah, Oluremi Tinubu, Aishatu Dahiru, Uche Ekwunife, Akon Eyakenyi and Betty Apiafe.

In 2019, she was re-elected as Senator representing Cross River State Northern Senatorial District for a second term, and was appointed  Chairman, Senate Committee on Trade and Investment.

Selected publications 
 1986: "Tense and Aspect in Yala". The Journal of West Africa Languages, Vol.1 pp. 37–52.
 1987: "Languages and Education in Nigeria. The Case of the English Language", in Ernest Emenyonu|Emenyonu E. N. (ed.) Studies in African Literature, pp. 229–311.
 1990: "Interrogation in Yala". Ph.D. Thesis, University of Port Harcourt.
 1992: The Grammar of Question Formation in Yala. Kraft's Book Publishers, Ibadan.

Membership of learned societies 
 West African Linguistics Society
 Linguistics Association of Nigeria
 The Association for Commonwealth Literature and Linguistics Studies
 Calabar Doyen Lioness Club
 Calabar Municipal Lions Club
 Yala Women's Association
 Cross River State Northern Women's Association
 Madonna Sisters Association
 Catholic Women Organisation
 Patron, Model Secondary School, Okpoma, Cross River State
 Vice President, Cross River State Association, Abuja
 Patron, Exquisite Ladies Association, Cross River State
 Patron, Voice of Women (Network Organisation), Cross River State
 Patron, Intimate Ladies Association, Cross River State

Member House of Representatives 
Senator Oko commenced a four-year tenure as Member House of Representatives, Yala/Ogoja Federal Constituency in June 2011.
That year she was appointed to the following committees:
 Deputy Chairman, House Committee on Education
 Member, House Committee on Gas
 Member, House Committee on Public Accounts
 Member, House Committee on Works
 Member, House Committee on Industry
 Member, House Committee on Army
 Member, House Committee on Women Affairs

Senator of the Federal Republic of Nigeria
She was elected a Senator twice, representing Cross River North senatorial district.
She was the chairman committee on Trade and investment.

Death
Oko died on 23 March 2020 in a hospital in London, United Kingdom. The cause of her death was undisclosed.

References

1956 births
People from Cross River State
University of Port Harcourt alumni
University of Calabar alumni
Members of the Senate (Nigeria)
Members of the House of Representatives (Nigeria)
21st-century Nigerian politicians
21st-century Nigerian women politicians
Women members of the Senate (Nigeria)
Peoples Democratic Party (Nigeria) politicians
2020 deaths